Niemur is a historic village community in the central west part of the Riverina and the site of a railway station.  It is situated about 24 kilometres south east of Moulamein and 27 kilometres north west of Burraboi.

Notes and references

Towns in the Riverina
Towns in New South Wales